Cuba is a Caribbean island country.

Cuba may also refer to:

Places
 Cuba Palace, in Palermo, Italy
 Cuba Street, Wellington, a street and a quarter in the Central Business District of Wellington, New Zealand
 Cuba, Portugal, a municipality and town in the district of Beja
 La Cuba, a municipality in Teruel, Aragon, Spain
 Avon (county), a defunct county in the west of England, where CUBA is an acronym for the "County that Used to Be Avon"

United States
 Cuba, Alabama
 Cuba, former name of Iceland, California
Cuba, Georgia
 Cuba, Illinois
 Cuba, Indiana
 Cuba, Owen County, Indiana
 Cuba, Kansas
 Cuba, Kentucky
 Cuba, Minnesota
 Cuba, Missouri, a city in Crawford County
 Cuba, Lafayette County, Missouri, a ghost town
 Cuba, New Mexico
 Cuba (town), New York
 Cuba (village), New York, in the town of Cuba
 Cuba, Clinton County, Ohio
 Cuba, Putnam County, Ohio
 Cuba, West Virginia
 Cuba City, Wisconsin
 Cuba Lake, a reservoir in New York
 Cuba Township, Becker County, Minnesota
 Cuba Township, Lake County, Illinois

People
 Alberto Cuba (born 1962), a Cuban long-distance runner
 Paul Cuba (1908–1990), an American football player
 Cuba Gooding, Sr. (1944–2017), a soul singer
 Cuba Gooding, Jr. (born 1968), a U.S. actor

Ships
 Cuba, a New Zealand Company barque that brought surveyors to Wellington, New Zealand in 1840
 SS Yorktown (1894), rebuilt in 1920 as the turbo-electric propelled passenger ship Cuba
 , formerly the German SS Coblenz (1897), renamed SS Cuba in 1920, that sank in 1923

Storms
 1910 Cuba hurricane, a category four hurricane that stalled west of Cuba, causing devastating flooding
 1924 Cuba hurricane, a category five hurricane that devastated western Cuba
 1932 Cuba hurricane, a category five hurricane that devastated Cuba

Other uses 
 Cuba (board game), see Havana (board game)
 Cuba (film), a 1979 film
 Cuba (song), a Gibson Brothers song
 Cuba, a 1987 album by the band The Silos
 Chinese University Basketball Association, a basketball league
 Club Universitario de Buenos Aires, a sports club
 A common name for Hemianthus callitrichoides, an aquatic plant
 A Roman goddess; see List of Roman birth and childhood deities
 A synonym for the legume genus Tachigali

See also
 CCUBA (Closed Circuit Underwater Breathing Apparatus), a type of breathing apparatus
 Cuban (disambiguation)
 Cube (disambiguation)
 Kuba (disambiguation)
 Quba